The Kainai Nation (or , or Blood Tribe) is a First Nations band government in southern Alberta, Canada, with a population of 12,800 members in 2015, up from 11,791 in December 2013.

The enemy Plains Cree call the Kainai , 'stained with blood', thus 'the bloodthirsty, cruel', therefore, the common English name for the tribe is the Blood tribe.

The Kainai speak a language of the Blackfoot linguistic group; their dialect is closely related to those of the Siksika and Piikani. They are one of three nations comprising the Blackfoot Confederacy.

At the time treaties such as Treaty 7 were signed, the Kainai were situated on the Oldman, Belly, and St. Mary rivers west of Lethbridge, Alberta.

Economy 
The Kainai Nation is engaged in diverse enterprises and they trade with domestic and international partners. Ammolite mining for example provides a rare highly demanded gem mineral to Asia for Feng Shui. Ammolite is currently known only to be found in the Bearpaw Formation as unique conditions of prehistoric times were optimal for the fossilization of marine life into ammolite. Over the years, mining operations have uncovered several oceanic dinosaur fossils which have been stored for study at the Royal Tyrrell Museum; however, they belong to the Kainai Nation.(Lawrynuik)

Specific claims 
The Kainai Nation filed many specific claims with the federal government. In 2017, a federal court ruled that the Crown had underestimated the band's population, which resulted in the band's reserve being smaller than it should have been.

In July 2019, the Kainai Nation settled a claim over Crown mismanagement of the band's ranching assets. The community received a $150 million cash settlement. Chief Roy Fox said that $123 million of this settlement will be used to develop "housing, capital works, a new administration building and a new skating rink".

Government

Band council 
The Kainai Nation is governed by an elected council of twelve to fifteen, with one chief. The term of office is four years. Historical chiefs of the Kainai are below:

 Last of the Hereditary Chiefs Traditional Chief Jim Shot Both Sides (1956–1980)
 
 Chief Chris Shade (1996–2004)
 Chief Charles Weasel Head (2004–2016)
 Chief Roy Fox (Makiinimaa – Curlew) (2016–Present)

Police force 
In pre-treaty times, the iikunuhkahtsi were a society responsible for the punishment of misdeeds.  The Blood reserve is currently policed by the Blood Tribe Police, with 31 officers in 2015.

Notable people 
 Cherish Violet Blood - stage and film actress
 Red Crow - 1887 Treaty Number Seven Chief 
 Byron Chief-Moon - performer and choreographer
 Eugene Creighton (Owns Many Horses)
 Eugene Brave Rock - actor and stunt man
 Faye HeavyShield - artist
Marie Smallface Marule - academic administrator, activist, and educator
Natawista Iksina (1825-1893) - interpreter and diplomat
 Jerry Potts
 Pete Standing Alone
 Seen from afar (1810-1869) - PEENAQUIM (Pe-na-koam, Penukwiim, translated as seen from afar, far seer, far off in sight, and far off dawn; also known as Onis tay say nah que im, Calf Rising in Sight, and Bull Collar), chief of the Blood tribe of the Blackfoot nation; b. c. 1810, probably in what is now southern Alberta, son of Two Suns; d. 1869 near the present city of Lethbridge, ALB
 Elle-Máijá Tailfeathers - Kainai and Sámi actress, producer, filmmaker and curatorial assistant
 Tom Three Persons - Rodeo athlete and rancher, best known for winning the saddle bronc competition at the inaugural Calgary Stampede in 1912

In popular culture 
In 1960, the Kainai and their Sun Dance were featured in the National Film Board of Canada (NFB) documentary Circle of the Sun. Tribal leaders had been concerned that the Sun Dance might be dying out, and had permitted filming as a visual record.

In 1973, the NFB released the documentary Kainai, which discusses the construction and consequences of a factory on their property.

In 2006, community leader Rick Tailfeathers contributed a small ammolite carving of a buffalo skull to the Six String Nation project. The object was permanently mounted on the interior of Voyageur, the guitar at the heart of the project. Following a presentation about the project in September 2014 at Tatsikiisaapo'p Middle School, project creator Jowi Taylor was presented with a braid of sweet grass by school principal Ramona Big Head. The braid resides in the headstock area in the bed of the guitar case.

On National Aboriginal Day in 2011, the NFB released the Pete Standing Alone trilogy, which includes Circle of the Sun, Standing Alone and a 2010 film, Round Up, documenting 50 years of the Kainai Nation as well as the life of elder Pete Standing Alone.

Historical newspapers 

 The Kainai News was one of Canada's first aboriginal newspapers and instrumental in the history of aboriginal journalism in Canada. It was published in southern Alberta by the Blood Indian Tribe and later by Indian News Media. Content focused on a range of local issues within the reserve as well as national issues such as the Indian Act, the Whitepaper and Bill C-31. Of particular significance are editorial cartoons by Everett Soop which were a regular feature of the newspaper.  Its first editor way Caen Bly, granddaughter of Senator James Gladstone.
 The Sun Dance Echo was a predecessor to the Kainai News. It was edited by Reggie Black Plume and occasionally contained articles by Hugh Dempsey.

Communities 
The Kainai nation communities include:

 Bullhorn
 Fish Creek
 Ft Whoop Up
 Levern
 Moses Lake
 Old Agency
 Standoff

See also 

 List of Indian reserves in Alberta

References

External links 

 Blood Tribe Information Web* Kainai Studies - Post secondary educational entity dedicated to Blackfoot teachings
 Introduction to photo essay from 'Nitsitapiisinni: Our Way of Life' museum exhibit
 Concise description of the Blackfoot tribes
 Pete Standing Alone Trilogy, National Film Board of Canada
 Brief biography of former chief Roy Fox
 Kainai News (1968-1991)
 Blackfoot Digital Library
 Blood Tribe page at Treaty 7 Management Corporation website

 
First Nations governments in Alberta